The Alatna River is a federally designated wild and scenic river partially contained within the boundaries of Gates of the Arctic National Park, Alaska. 

It is called one of the most beautiful rivers in the United States.

Geography
The Alatna River stems from the central Brooks Range flowing through the Endicott Mountains, passing Circle Lake, the Arrigetch Peaks and Takahula Lake before entering the Helpmejack Hills. The last section of the river continues to flow in a SSE direction through the Alatna Hills into its confluence with the Koyukuk River near the small village of Allakaket. The river then mellows out near Takahula and Circle Lake becoming deeper and more meandering while the scenery turns from mountain peaks into hilly boreal forest.

Tourism
The river is very popular for float trips due to its calm flow and wonderful scenery.  Float trips usually take from four to fourteen days, depending on put-in spot and pick-up spot, and also weather/river conditions. One common place to put in is Circle Lake, a small lake which is float plane accessible and is located in a beautiful part of the valley. Another place to put in is Takahula Lake, a larger, float-plane accessible lake, further downstream from Circle Lake. Gaedeke Lake is also a possible put in spot, but according to the Alaska River Guide, this upstream section near the headwaters of the river is shallow and rocky making portaging or lining necessary. Most floaters take out at the village of Allakaket.

Exploration
Bob Marshall made an exploratory mapping trip up the river in 1931, following the river drainage from Allakaket upstream, to the Kutuk River, and onwards to the Brooks Range.  He was following in the footsteps of Philip Smith in 1911, the Murie brothers Olas and Adolph in 1923, and the Smith, Fitzgerald, and Mertie USGS trip of 1924.

References

Karen Jettmar, The Alaska River Guide: Canoeing, Kayaking, and Rafting in the Last Frontier. Menasha Ridge Press: Birmingham, Alabama. 3rd edition 2008, pp. 86–89

External links
 Gates Of The Arctic National Park and Preserve
 Alatna River Information from the American Whitewater organization
 National Wild and Scenic Rivers System National Wild and Scenic Rivers System

Rivers of Alaska
Rivers of Yukon–Koyukuk Census Area, Alaska
Gates of the Arctic National Park and Preserve
Brooks Range
Tributaries of the Yukon River
Rivers of Unorganized Borough, Alaska
Wild and Scenic Rivers of the United States